The European Society for Biomaterials (ESB) is a non-profit organisation that encourages research and spread of information regarding research and uses of biomaterials. Founded in March 1976, became a member of the International Union of Societies for Biomaterials Sciences and Engineering (IUS-BSE) at its conception, in 1979. It has approximately 750 members in 33 different countries worldwide (2017). It organises an annual meeting where recent developments mainly within academic research of biomaterials are presented.

The ESB home journal is the Journal of Materials Science: Materials in Medicine (ISSN 0957-4530) published by Springer. Each year a special issue of selected contributions to the annual conference is published.

External links
The European Society for Biomaterials
History of the ESB - A pdf file with the history of the first 25 years of the Society
Journal of Materials Science: Materials in Medicine (ISSN 0957-4530)

European medical and health organizations
International scientific organizations based in Europe
Scientific organizations established in 1976